Okenia eolida is a species of sea slug, specifically a dorid nudibranch, a marine gastropod mollusc in the family Goniodorididae.

Distribution
This species was described from the South China Sea. It has been found in many places in the western Pacific Ocean including Japan, Hong Kong, New Zealand, Australia and the Philippines.

Description
This Okenia has a broad body and five elongate lateral papillae on each side of the mantle. The colour is translucent white covered with brown patches which almost touch, leaving a pattern of lines between them.

Ecology
The diet of this species is probably the bryozoans Membranipora membranacea, Cryptosula pallasiana and Jellyella tuberculata.

References

External links 

Goniodorididae
Gastropods described in 1832